TSQ: Transgender Studies Quarterly is a quarterly peer-reviewed academic journal covering transgender studies, with an emphasis on cultural studies and the humanities. Established in 2014 and published by Duke University Press, it is the first non-medical journal about transgender studies. 

The founding editors-in-chief are Susan Stryker (University of Arizona) and Paisley Currah (Brooklyn College and Graduate Center, CUNY), and were joined by Francisco J. Galarte (University of Arizona) in 2019.

Publication history
In the introduction to the first issue, Currah and Stryker state that they intend the journal to be a gathering place for different ideas within the field of transgender studies, and that they embrace multiple definitions of transgender.

In an interview about the journal, Stryker stated that she felt she had been working on the first issue since the 1990s. While co-editing a special transgender studies issue of Women's Studies Quarterly in 2008, Stryker and Currah realized the need for a publication dedicated to the topic, when they received over 200 submissions for the special issue but were only able to publish 12. In May 2013, they started a month-long Kickstarter campaign to help fund the journal. They received more than US$10,000 in donations in the first five days; by the end of the campaign, the journal had nearly $25,000 in crowdfunded capital.

Because the first call for submissions drew a considerable amount of interest, the first issue was expanded into a book-length double issue with 86 essays. The title of the first issue, "Postposttranssexual", comes from Sandy Stone's 1992 article "The Empire Strikes Back: A Posttranssexual Manifesto", which has been called the start of transgender studies. Each essay in this issue focuses on key concepts within transgender studies. 

Each issue of TSQ addresses specific themes, with the exception of the un-themed, open call issue released February 1, 2018. Past issue themes have included surgery, pedagogy, archives, trans/feminisms, and blackness.

Mission
TSQ takes an inclusive approach to scholarship. As part of its goals, the journal's mission statement notes it "explores the diversity of gender, sex, sexuality, embodiment, and identity in ways that have not been adequately addressed by feminist and queer scholarship." 

In the 2006 essay "(De)Subjugated Knowledges: An Introduction to Transgender Studies", Susan Stryker, one of the co-founders of the journal, said that there was a need for more racial diversity within the field of transgender studies. She argued that the lack of diversity, likely caused by the discrimination people of color face that keep them from academia, means that transgender studies cannot be regarded as a whole and complete field without these voices. 

In the maiden issue, Regina Kunzel writes about tensions that could emerge when a discipline becomes institutionalized through the advent of an academic journal—become US-centric, conform to neoliberalism, and exclude bodies outside of or without access to academia.

Politics
Currah and Stryker embrace a broad definition of trans within their journal, as is marked by the asterisk in the journal's logo. Additionally, it is visible through such journal themes as tranimalities, which explores the trans potential of the human and non-human binary.  

The journal acknowledges the Eurocentric history of the term transgender as it is used today and chooses to respectfully embrace the term as a potential unifier for global gender experiences. A major focus of the journal is to embrace the view within transgender studies that transgender people are able to be both subject of knowledge and object of knowledge, meaning that they understand their experience as transgender people through simply being transgender rather than through other methods of authority.

See also

International Journal of Transgender Health
List of transgender publications

References

External links

Duke University Press academic journals
English-language journals
LGBT-related journals
Publications established in 2014
Quarterly journals
Transgender literature
Transgender studies
LGBT literature in the United States